The Godfather is a side-scrolling run and gun video game released by U.S. Gold in 1991 for the Amiga, Atari ST, and MS-DOS. The plot is based on the three Godfather films. There are five levels which reflect the locations seen in the movies, including the streets of New York City, Miami, and the village of Corleone in Sicily.

Review scores for the Amiga ranged from 40% to 95%.

Gameplay
The Godfather is a side-scrolling run and gun game with occasional first-person sequences. The player walks along the street, shooting enemy gangsters while avoiding shooting innocent people. Each level ends with a boss, as well as brief mini games. The final level consists of taking down an enemy helicopter while protecting Michael Corleone.

Reception
Amiga Computing praised its graphics (five out of five stars), but panned both its gameplay and addictiveness (one star each) and awarded it a below-average 40% overall.

References

External links
The Godfather at Atari Mania
The Godfather at Amiga Hall of Light

1991 video games
Amiga games
Atari ST games
DOS games
Run and gun games
U.S. Gold games
Video games based on novels
Video games based on adaptations
Video games set in New York City
Video games set in Miami
Video games set in Sicily
Organized crime video games
Video games based on films
Works based on The Godfather
Video games developed in the United Kingdom